Saint-Laurent-de-Trèves is a former commune in the Lozère department in southern France. On 1 January 2016, it was merged into the new commune of Cans-et-Cévennes.

See also
Communes of the Lozère department
Causse Méjean

References

Saintlaurentdetreves